Lardirago is a comune (municipality) in the Province of Pavia in the Italian region Lombardy, located about 25 km south of Milan and about 9 km northeast of Pavia.

Lardirago borders the following municipalities: Bornasco, Ceranova, Marzano, Roncaro, Sant'Alessio con Vialone.

Twin towns
Lardirago is twinned with:

  Ribeira Grande, Cape Verde

References

External links
 Official website

Cities and towns in Lombardy